Low technology (low tech; adjective forms: low-technology, low-tech, lo-tech) is simple technology, as opposed to high technology.

History

Historical origin 

Primitive technologies such as bushcraft, tools that use wood, stone, wool, etc. can be seen as low-tech, as the pre-industrial revolution machines such as windmills or sailboats.

In the 70s 

The  economic boom after the war resulted in a doubt on progress, technology and infinite growth at the beginning of the 70s, notably with through the report The Limits to Growth (1972). Many have sought to define what soft technologies are, leading to the low-tech movement. Such technologies have been described as "intermediaries" (E.F. Schumacher), "liberating" (M. Bookchin), or even democratic. Thus, a philosophy of advocating a widespread use of soft technologies was developed in the United States, and many studies were carried out in those years, in particular by researchers like Langdon Winner.

2000s and later 

"Low-tech" has been more and more employed in the scientific writings, in particular in the analyzes of the work from some authors of the 1970s: see for example Hirsch ‐ Kreinsen, the book "High tech, low tech, no tech"  or Gordon. 

More recently, the perspective of resource scarcity  - especially minerals - lead to an increasingly severe criticism on high-techs and technology.

Since 2007, the Dutch Kris de Decker has published (with his collaborators) some reflections on low-tech solutions, the problem of high-techs, and the updating of technologies supposedly "obsolete" via the "Low <-tech Magazine". The header is: "Doubts on progress and technology", and specifies that the lowtechs "refuse to assume that each problem has a high-tech solution", with a progressive translation of the articles in other languages since recently.

In 2014, the french engineer Philippe Bihouix published "L'âge des low tech" (The age of low-techs) where he presents how a european nation like France, with little mineral and energy resources, could become a "low-tech" nation (instead of a "start-up" nation) to better correspond to the sustainable development goals of such nation. He cites various examples of low-techs initiative and describe the low-tech philosophy and principles. In 2015, the Low-tech Lab project opened, consisting in a low-tech web platform for documentation and free sharing ('wiki' type) of inventions, and to put forward reflections on the low-tech philosophy.

Recently: retro-tech, wild tech, rebel-tech, small-tech, (s)low-tech,  easy-tech, no-tech, lo-tek 
Numerous new definitions have come to supplement or qualify the term "low-tech", intended to be more precise because they are restricted to a particular characteristic:

 retro-tech: more oriented toward old but smart inventions (not necessarily useful, durable and accessible), parallels can nevertheless be found with low-tech, because these innovations often are decentralized and simpler technologies (because manufactured by individuals) ". 

 Wild-tech: beyond the high-tech / low-tech opposition, it intends to give "tools to better think these ways of manufacturing which escape any classification". The unclassifiable techs. Can also be linked to "tech rebel", a movement whose goal is to hack and to re-appropriate any type of technology.

 small-tech: opposed to "Big Tech", which includes the GAFAM. It thus referred to digital questions, "in the perspective of maintaining a high level of technological complexity but on the basis of the notions of commons, collaborative work and the principles of democracy and social justice" 

 (s)lowtech, or slow-tech: uses the play-on-words (s)low / slow. Aims at: "exploring the drawbacks of technology and its effects on human health and development". Also indicates a movement aimed at reducing addiction to technology, especially among the youngsters. However, its highest similarity with the definition of low-techs is that it is restricted to technologies (of all kinds) that promote a slow lifestyle.

 easy-tech: technology easy to implement, to use, and accessible to all. At the heart of the commonly accepted definition of low-tech.

 no-tech: promotes a lifestyle avoiding the use of technology, when possible. It joins some technocritical writings on the negative and time-consuming aspect of most "modern" technologies. See for example no-tech magazine.

 Lo-Tek (or LoTek): name introduced by Julia Watson for her book "The Power of Lo — TEK - A global exploration of nature-based technology". The author brings together multigenerational knowledge and practices to "counter the idea that  aboriginal innovation is primitive and exists isolated from technology. " TEK is the acronym for "Traditional Ecological Knowledge".

Many definitions

Binary definition
According to the Cambridge International Dictionary of English, the concept of low-tech is simply defined as a technique that is not recent, or using old materials. Companies that are considered low-tech have a simple operation. The less sophisticated an object, the more low-tech. This definition does not take into account the ecological or social aspect, as it is only based on a simplistic definition of low-tech philosophy. The low-techs would then be seen as a "step backwards", and not as possible innovation.

Also, with this definition, the "high-tech" (ex: the telegraph) of a certain era becomes the "low-tech" of the one after (ex: compared to the telephone).

Technocriticists

Low-tech is sometimes described as an "anti high-tech" movement, as a deliberate renunciation of a complicated and expensive technology. This kind of protest movement criticizes any disproportionate technology: a comparison with the neo-luddic or  technocritical movements, which appeared since the Industrial Revolution, is then possible. This critical part of the low-tech movement can be called "no-tech", see for instance "No-tech magazine".

Recently: a wider and more balanced approach
A second, more nuanced definition of low-tech may appear. This definition takes into account the  philosophical, environmental and social aspects. Low-tech are no longer restricted to old techniques, but also extended to new, future-oriented techniques, more ecological and intended to recreate social bounds. A low-tech innovation is then possible.

Contrary to the first definition, this one is much more optimistic and has a positive connotation. It would then oppose the planned obsolescence of objects (often “high-tech”) and question the consumer society, as well as the materialist principles underneath. With this definition, the concept of low-tech thus implies that anyone could make objects using their intelligence, and share their know-how to popularize their creations. A low-tech must therefore be accessible to all, and could therefore help in reduction of  inequalities.

Furthermore, some reduce the definition of low-tech to meet basic needs (eating, drinking, housing, heating ...), which disqualifies many technologies from the definition of low-techs, but this definition does not is not always accepted. Finally, considering that the definition of low-tech is relative, some prefer to use lower tech, to emphasize a higher sobriety compared to high-tech, without claiming to be perfectly "low".

Examples of low technology

From traditional practices (primary and secondary sectors) 
Note: almost all of the entries in this section should be prefixed by the word traditional.

 weaving produced on non-automated looms, and basketry.
 hand wood-working, joinery, coopering, and carpentry.
 the trade of the ship-wright.
 the trade of the wheel-wright.
 the trade of the wainwright: making wagons. (the Latin word for a two-wheeled wagon is carpentum, the maker of which was a carpenter.)

(Wright is the agent form of the word wrought, which itself is the original past passive participle of the word work, now superseded by the weak verb forms worker and worked respectively.)
 blacksmithing and the various related smithing and metal-crafts.
 folk music played on acoustic instruments.
 mathematics (particularly, pure mathematics)
 organic farming and animal husbandry (i.e.; agriculture as practiced by all American farmers prior to World War II).
 milling in the sense of operating hand-constructed equipment with the intent to either grind grain, or the reduction of timber to lumber as practiced in a saw-mill.
 fulling, felting, drop spindle spinning, hand knitting, crochet, & similar textile preparation.
 the production of charcoal by the collier, for use in home heating, foundry operations, smelting, the various smithing trades, and for brushing ones teeth as in Colonial America.
 glass-blowing.
 various subskills of food preservation:
 smoking
 salting
 pickling
 drying

Note: home canning is a counter example of a low technology since some of the supplies needed to pursue this skill rely on a global trade network and an existing manufacturing infrastructure.

 the production of various alcoholic beverages:
 wine: poorly preserved fruit juice.
 beer: a way to preserve the calories of grain products from decay.
 whiskey: an improved (distilled) form of beer.
 flint-knapping
 masonry as used in castles, cathedrals, and root cellars.

Domestic or consumer 

(Non exhaustive) list of low-techs in a westerner's everyday life:
 get around by bike, and repair it with second-hand materials
 use a cargo bike to carry loads (rather than a gasoline vehicle)
 drying clothes on a clothesline or on a drying rack
 wash clothes by hand, or in a human-powered washing machine
 cool your home with a fan, an air expander (rather than electrical appliances such as air conditioners)
 a bell as door bell
 a cellar or "desert fridge" or icebox (rather than a fridge or freezer)
 Long-distance travel by sailing boat (rather than by plane)
 A wicker bag or a Tote bag (rather than a plastic bag) to carry things
 Swedish lighter (rather than disposable lighter or matches)
 paper + pushpin (rather than a post-it)
 A hand drill, instead of an electric one
 Lighting up with sunlight or candles
 Hemp textiles
 To water plants with a drip irrigation
 paper sheet for note-taking
 To clean with a broom (rather than a vacuum cleaner)
 To find one's way with map & compass (rather than by GPS)

Philosophy 
Among the thinkers opposed to modern technologies, Jacques Ellul (The Technological Society, 1954; The technological bluff, 1988), Lewis Mumford and E. F. Schumacher. In the second volume of his book The Myth of the Machine (1970), Lewis Mumford develops the notion of "biotechnology", to designate "bioviable" techniques that would be considered as ecologically responsible, i.e. which establish a homeostatic relationship between resources and needs. In his famous Small is beautiful (1973), Schumacher uses the concept of "intermediate technology", which corresponds fairly precisely to what "low tech" means. He has also created the "Intermediate Technology Development Group”.

Differences between green-tech and low-tech

Debate on the 'real' low-techs, and difference(s) with high tech

Legal status of low-technology

By federal law in the United States, only those articles produced with little or no use of machinery or tools with complex mechanisms may be stamped with the designation "hand-wrought" or "hand-made". Lengthy court-battles are currently underway over the precise definition of the terms "organic" and "natural" as applied to foodstuffs.

Groups associated with low-technology

 Arts and Crafts Movement, popularized by Gustav Stickley in America around 1900.
 Bauhaus movement of Germany around the same time.
 Do-It-Yourself phenomenon arising in America following World War II.
 Back-to-the-land movement beginning in America during the 1960s.
 Luddites, whose activities date to the very beginning of the Industrial Revolution.
 Living history and open-air museums around the world, which strives to recreate bygone societies.
 Simple living adherents, such as the Amish and to a lesser extent some sects of the Mennonites, who specifically refuse some newer technologies to avoid undesirable effects on themselves or their societies.
 Survivalists are often proponents, since low-technology is inherently more robust than its high-technology counterpart.

See also
 Obsolescence
 Do it yourself
 Anti-consumerism
 Degrowth
 Simple living
 Embodied energy
 Intermediate technology – sometimes used to mean technology between low and high technology

Sources

References

General
 Merriam webster dictionary

External links
 Low-Tech Magazine – Doubts on progress and technology
 Low-tech lab (english version)

Technology by type
Design
Simple_living